Eucalyptus acies, commonly known as the Woolbernup mallee is a straggly shrub that is endemic to a restricted part of the south-west of Western Australia. It has smooth bark, lance-shaped leaves, club-shaped flower buds with prominent ridges on their sides, creamy white flowers and hemispherical to bell-shaped fruit.

Description
It usually has several main stems and its young branches are more or less square in cross section.
The adult leaves are thick and coarse,  in length with a lanceolate blade. Starting as a blue dullish green the leaves mature to a glossy green. The stamens are creamy white and all are fertile.

Taxonomy and naming
Eucalyptus acies was first formally described in 1972 by Ian Brooker and the description was published in the journal Nuytsia from a specimen he collected on a hill known as Woolbernup in the Fitzgerald River National Park. The specific epithet (acies) is a Latin word meaning "the point or edge of a weapon", referring to the angled branchlets of this species.

Distribution and habitat
The Woolbernup mallee grows in low shrubland and heath on quartzite hills and granite boulders in near-coastal areas between Bremer Bay and Hopetoun.

Conservation status
This mallee is classified as "not threatened" by the Western Australian Government Department of Parks and Wildlife.

See also
List of Eucalyptus species

References

acies
Eucalypts of Western Australia
Myrtales of Australia
Plants described in 1972
Taxa named by Ian Brooker